The Belgian 7th Line Infantry Battalion (Dutch: Bataljon Infanterie van Linie nr. 7) was a Belgian/Southern Netherlands regular (line) battalion commanded by lieutenant-kolonel F.C. van den Sande which fought with distinction during the Waterloo Campaign of 1815.

Formation
The 7th originated from the 2de Regiment "Vlaanderen" of the Belgisch Legioen. The Battalion was stationed in Ghent where it would also receive its colours. A lot of officers, Non-commissioned officers and men were veterans of the Grande Armée of Napoleon Bonaparte.

Waterloo Campaign
The 7th played an important role in both the Battles of Quatre Bras and Waterloo, where Napoleon Bonaparte was finally defeated by the Anglo-allied army commanded by the Duke of Wellington and the Prussians under Prince Blucher. As a part of the 1st "Brigade van Bylandt" the Battalion first saw action at Quatre Bras on 16 June 1815, to counter the advance of the French Army. Two days later, on 18 June, during the Battle of Waterloo it had to endure the first massive attack by the French I Corps commanded by d'Erlon. When the Brigade had to withdraw through sheer weight of numbers, the 7th was able to hold up the French I Corps long enough for the neighbouring British 8th and 9th brigades to move in to fill the gaps. Even though the entire Brigade van Bylandt received heavy losses, they would remain in place for the entire battle.

After the Battle of Waterloo the Wellington's Anglo-allied army, including the 7th, moved onto Paris.

Merger
After the occupation the Battalion returned to the Southern Netherlands. In December 1815 it would be merged with 3 Battalions of Nationale Militie (30, 31 and 32) into the 6de Afdeeling Infanterie.

References
Barbero, Allesandro (2006), The Battle: A new history of Waterloo, Walker & Company.
Boulder, Demetrius C. (2005), The Belgians at Waterloo.
Muilwijk, Erwin (2012), 1815 – From mobilisation to war, Souvereign House Books, Bleiswijk.
Muilwijk, Erwin (2013), Quatre Bras – Perponcher's gamble', Souvereign House Books, Bleiswijk.
Muilwijk, Erwin (2014), Standing firm at Waterloo, Souvereign House Books, Bleiswijk.
Op de Beeck, Johan (2013), Waterloo – De laatste 100 dagen van Napoleon, Manteau Uitgeverij.
Pawly, Ronald (2001), Wellington's Belgian allies, Osprey Publishing.

External links
 7de Linie (BE) – Belgian re-enactment association portraying a centre company of the Bataljon Infanterie van Linie Nr. 7.
 7de Linie (NL) – Dutch re-enactment association portraying a centre company of the Bataljon Infanterie van Linie Nr. 7.
 7ème Bataillon belge 1815 – Historical/folkloristic association from Jumet (Belgium) which portrays the Bataljon Infanterie van Linie Nr. 7 during the yearly Tour de la Madeleine.
 The 'Cowards' at Waterloo – Webpage describing the Belgo-Dutch performance and actions during Quatre Bras and Waterloo

Army units and formations of Belgium
Army units and formations of the Netherlands
Military units and formations established in 1815
1815 establishments in the Netherlands